Mike Bryan and Mark Knowles were the defending champions but only Bryan competed that year with his brother Bob.

The Bryans won in the final 7–6(7–3), 4–6, 7–6(7–4) against Joshua Eagle and Jared Palmer.

Seeds

  Bob Bryan /  Mike Bryan (champions)
  Mahesh Bhupathi /  Todd Woodbridge (first round)
  Joshua Eagle /  Jared Palmer (final)
  Chris Haggard /  Robbie Koenig (semifinals)

Draw

External links
 2003 Nottingham Open Doubles draw

Nottingham Open
2003 ATP Tour